Eragrostis episcopulus, the cliff hair grass, is a species of grass endemic to St. Helena. The species is classified as Critically Endangered because of its extremely restricted range and population fragmentation.

Distribution 
It is found on cliffs of St. Helena, at 250 to 550 metres above sea level.

References 

episcopulus